Scandal Supervisor (Korean: 사건반장; RR: sagonbanjang; lit. Case Chief) is a South Korean current affairs program airing on JTBC. It airs Monday to Fridays at 15:25-16:45 KST and is presented by Yang Won-bo and Kim Ha-eun. The broadcast does not use the same color palette as other JTBC newscasts, but it has used the JTBC News design since February 2017.

Background 

Three issues are presented each day through the Today... segments, and four other events are dealt with briefly through the Crime Scene corner.

Current segments 

Incident Situation Room (사건상황실) - formerly called Crime Scene (사건 현장), Kim Ha-eun hosts this segment that reports about minor incidents.
Today's Incident # (오늘, 사건 #) - this segment deals with a certain incident that happened that day.
Today's Law # (오늘, 법 #) - this segment will delve into a certain law involving an incident.
Today's Person # (오늘, 인물 #) - this segment analyzes a person's involvement in an incident.
Incident X-Files (사건 X파일) - this segment introduces famous historical events.
Crime Scene (사건 현장) - this segment is presented ala-3:10 Relay, where the panel will analyze a clip as it plays on the screen.
Scandal Supervisor Family Desk (사반 가족회의) - this web-only segment premiered on April 13, 2021 right after the broadcast. Anchor Yang Won-bo is joined by attorney Park Ji-hoon and reporter Hong Ji-yong on Tuesdays, while attorney Baek Sung-moon and reporter Lee Do-sung join on Thursdays.

Scandal Supervisor Family Desk segments 

 Scandal Supervisor Replay (사반 다시보기) is a segment that introduces the top story in detail while reading comments from the live chat.
 Scandal Supervisor Preview (사반 미리보기) is a segment that previews the top story that will air on the broadcast the next day.
 Today's Agenda (오늘의 안건) is a segment that deals with trending topics on the Internet or viewer-submitted content.

Former segments 

 The World Where We Live In - formerly the fifth main segment, this segment presents stories of people who have done good in the society, a contrast to the heavy atmosphere brought by the cases/issues in the previous segments.
Relationship Office - this former sixth main segment deals with stories sent by viewers.
Pyo Chang-won's Question Mark (표창원의 물음표) - anchor Pyo Chang-won delivers his opening brief about the top story that will be covered on Today's Incident #1.
Today's Incident (사건 오늘) - the panel talk about top issues that day divided into four corners.
Pyo Chang-won's Period (표창원의 마침표) - Pyo Chang-won will deliver a closing commentary based on the top story that day.
Out with the Old, In with the New (헌 법 줄게 새 법 다오) - anchor Pyo Chang-won discusses controversial laws with the panel in this Monday-only segment.
 Incident Montage (사건 몽타주) - this Tuesday-only segment explores the central character of the case covered on Today's Incident #1 , and analyzes the case through the person mentioned.
 Incident Investigation Group (사건 역학조사단) - this Wednesday-only segment seems to delve into why and how a certain incident happened in-depth with experts from different backgrounds.
 Historical Theories (사건 평행이론) - this Thursday-only segment tackles a certain historical event and analyzes how much has changed since the event happened.
 Case Investigation Institute (사건 수사연구소) - this Friday-only segment investigates events scientifically with experts. It seems to be similar to the Wednesday segment Incident Investigation Group .

Panel 
It is currently presented by Yang Won-bo, with Kim Ha-eun presenting the Crime Scene segment. The panelists have been reduced to two from four due to the reorganization, but on December 7, social affairs reporters Lee Do-sung and Gong Da-som joined the panel, making the panelists four. Sometime in 2021, Gong Da-som left the panel and was replaced by Hong Ji-yong from the same team.

Current fixed panelists 

 Hong Ji-yong, JTBC social affairs reporter
 Lee Do-sung, JTBC social affairs reporter
Baek Sung-moon, lawyer (Mondays and Thursdays)
Park Ji-hoon, lawyer (Tuesdays)
Sohn Soo-ho, lawyer (Wednesdays)
Yang Ji-yeol, lawyer (Fridays)

Former panelists 
 Choi Young-il, critic
 Jang Hee-young, critic
 Kim Bok-joon, researcher at Korea Institute of Criminology
Jung Jin-ho, JoongAng Ilbo social affairs reporter
Lee Ji-hye, JTBC legal team reporter
Kim Joon-il, NewsTop reporter
Park Jung-ho, OhmyNews reporter
Kim Hyung-sun, Naeil Shimun reporter

References 

JTBC original programming